Villa Santo Stefano is a comune (municipality) in the Province of Frosinone in the Italian region Lazio, located about  southeast of Rome and about  south of Frosinone.

Villa Santo Stefano borders the following municipalities: Amaseno, Castro dei Volsci, Ceccano, Giuliano di Roma, Prossedi.

References

Cities and towns in Lazio